Sophie of Brunswick-Lüneburg (30 October 1563 – 14 January 1639) was a member of the House of Brunswick-Lüneburg and margravine of Brandenburg-Ansbach and Brandenburg-Kulmbach and Duchess of Krnov by marriage.

Life 
Sophie was the eldest child of Duke William the Younger of Brunswick-Lüneburg (1535–1592) from his marriage to Dorothea of Denmark, a daughter of King Christian III of Denmark.

On 3 May 1579 she married Margrave George Frederick I of Brandenburg-Ansbach-Kulmach (1539–1603) in Dresden.  George Frederick was the last of the older line of Frankish Hohenzollerns and was simultaneously Margrave of the Principality of Ansbach and Kulmbach, Silesian duke of the Duchy of Krnov and guardian administrator of the Duchy of Prussia. As such, he was a powerful figure of his time.  His first wife, Elisabeth of Brandenburg-Küstrin, had died in 1578, and like his first, George Frederick's second marriage remained childless, which is why his inheritance needed to be regulated by the House Treaty of Gera.  Sophie's childlessness motivated her husband to increased interest in the policy of the wider House of Hohenzollern.

After her husband died in 1604, Sophie returned to her birth family.  She survived her husband by 36 years.  Sophie often stayed in Nuremberg with her sisters Clara, Countess of Schwarzburg, and Sibylle, Duchess of Brunswick-Dannenberg. She died in Nuremberg in 1639 and was buried in the St. Lorenz Church there.

The Renaissance portal of Wülzburg Castle shows George Frederick's coat of arms next to Sophie's.

|-
 

|-

Footnotes 

1563 births
1639 deaths
Duchesses of Brunswick-Lüneburg
House of Hohenzollern
Consorts of Brandenburg
New House of Lüneburg
Daughters of monarchs